Michigan Township may refer to the following places in Indiana:
 Michigan Township, Clinton County, Indiana
 Michigan Township, LaPorte County, Indiana

See also 
Michigan Township (disambiguation)

Indiana township disambiguation pages